, born , was the tenth child and sixth daughter of Emperor Meiji of Japan, and the third child and second daughter of Sono Sachiko, the Emperor's fifth concubine.

Biography

Masako was born in Tokyo Prefecture, the daughter of Emperor Meiji and Lady Sachiko. She held the childhood appellation "Tsune no miya" (Princess Tsune).

Her future husband, Prince Tsunehisa Takeda, was the eldest son of Prince Kitashirakawa Yoshihisa and thus the brother of Prince Kitashirakawa Naruhisa. Emperor Meiji authorized Prince Tsunehisa to start a new princely house in March 1906, largely to provide a household with suitable status for his sixth daughter Princess Tsune. Prince Takeda married Princess Masako on 30 April 1908, by whom he had a son and a daughter:

 
 , married Count Sano Tsunemitsu.

She died on 8 March 1940, aged 51.

Honours
 Grand Cordon of the Order of the Precious Crown

Ancestry

References 

1888 births
1940 deaths
Japanese princesses
Takeda-no-miya

Grand Cordons (Imperial Family) of the Order of the Precious Crown
People from Tokyo
19th-century Japanese people
19th-century Japanese women
20th-century Japanese people
20th-century Japanese women